Hadi al-Bahra (born in Damascus on February 13, 1959) is a member of the Syrian opposition movement who was the President of the National Coalition for Syrian Revolutionary and Opposition Forces from 9 July 2014 until 4 January 2015.

Childhood and education
Al-Bahra holds a BS in Industrial Engineering from Wichita State University in the United States.

Pre Syrian Uprising 
Prior to the Syrian Uprising that started in 2011 after street protests were violently repressed, al-Bahra held the position of Executive Director of Erfan and Bagedo general hospital in Jeddah, Saudi Arabia in the period 1983–1987. In the period from 1987 until 2003, became CEO of Horizon of Commercial development Co, then general manager of Horizon International Exhibitions for the period 2004–2005, a company operating in the free zone in Damascus, Syria and then the CEO of Techno Media from 2005 until 2011. Al-Bahra has extensive experience in communications systems, information technology, interactive display systems, and the organization of conferences and events.

Syrian civil war
Al-Bahra used his experience in communications technology to support the Syrian opposition, where he contributed to the establishment of support groups to coordinate communication between Syrian activists and the regional and international media, he worked with the opposition inside Syria, contributing to the media, relief activities and the political side of the protests. Al-Bahra joined the SOC in the expansion that took place on 31 May 2013. He was then elected to be the general secretary of the political committee. The coalition chose him to be the chief negotiator of its delegation to the Geneva II Conference on Syria. al-Bahra was elected as president in Istanbul, Turkey on 9 July 2014, with 62 votes, defeating his nearest rival Mouaffaq Nyrabia, who received 41 votes.

References

The president of the Syrian National Coalition, Hadi al-Bahra, discusses the opposition movement's fight to defeat ISIS and gain liberation from Bashar al-Assad

فرنسا تهنئ السيد هادي البحرة لانتخابه رئيسا للائتلاف الوطني السوري 

كلمة رئيس الائتلاف الوطني السوري هادي البحرة في جامعة الدول العربية 

هادي البحرة لـ"الجارديان": التحالف الدولي يركز على "داعش" ويتجاهل تجاوزات النظام 

بيان لوزارة الخارجية الأميركية حول انتخاب السيد هادي البحرة رئيساً كواليس جينيف 2 – حوار مع هادي البحرة

فاجأ رئيس الائتلاف السوري هادي البحرة، اللاجئين السوريين في مخيماتهم في تركيا، بزيارة أضفت على شفاه الأطفال الابتسامة

External links
 Syrian National Council profile

1959 births
Living people
People from Damascus
National Coalition of Syrian Revolutionary and Opposition Forces members
Wichita State University alumni